Mayor of Ridgefield, New Jersey

Anthony R. Suarez 2004 to present. He was arrested in Operation Bid Rig and later acquitted.
Alexander Shaler (1827–1911) 1899 to 1901.
W. B. Pugh circa 1895 for two terms, he was the first mayor.

References

 
Ridgefield, New Jersey